Town Bus Terminus Salem popularly known as Old Bus Stand, Salem, is the main Town bus terminus of Salem City.

Overview

Being a major transit point in the central region of the state, and spreading over an area of  this terminus is managed by Department of Transport (Tamil Nadu), experiences a heavy traffic of operating about 1,500 buses.

Connections

Renovation 
Under the Central Government's Smart Cities Mission, the Salem Municipal Corporation began demolishing the terminus to build a new two-tiered bus station at a cost of ₹92.13 crores.

See also
 Central Bus Terminus Salem
 Transport in Tamil Nadu
 Salem Junction
 Tamil Nadu State Transport Corporation
 State Express Transport Corporation (Tamil Nadu)

References

External links 
 salem City Municipal Corporation
 TNSTC Online Ticket Booking
 KSRTC Online Ticket Booking

Bus stations in Salem, Tamil Nadu
Transport in Salem, Tamil Nadu